The A 29 is a major toll motorway in Normandy and Picardy, northwestern and northern France.  The road is also part of European route E44. From its western interchange with the A28 autoroute until its junction with the A26 autoroute, part of the A29 also forms the northern section of the Grand contournement de Paris.

Route
The road connects the port of Le Havre with the A 26 at Saint-Quentin.  It also has junctions with the A 13, A 131, A 16, A 28, and A 1 autoroutes.

Junctions

External links
A29 autoroute in Saratlas

A29
Transport in Normandy